Colonel Holman Fred Stephens (31 October 1868 – 23 October 1931) was a British light railway civil engineer and manager. He was engaged in engineering and building, and later managing, 16 light railways in England and Wales.

Biography 
Stephens was the son of Frederic George Stephens, Pre-Raphaelite artist and art critic, and his wife the artist Rebecca Clara (née Dalton). He was named after his father's friend and former tutor, the painter Holman Hunt, although the two later fell out. He was a great nephew of the naturalist, explorer and biologist, Charles Darwin.

Stephens was apprenticed in the workshops of the Metropolitan Railway in 1881. He was an assistant engineer during the building of the Cranbrook and Paddock Wood Railway, which opened in 1892. In 1894 he became an associate member of the Institution of Civil Engineers, which allowed him to design and build railways in his own right.

He immediately set about his lifetime's project of operating light railways for rural areas, mostly planned and built under the 1896 Light Railways Act. His first two railways, the Rye and Camber Tramway and the Hundred of Manhood and Selsey Tramway, predated this, but he built the first railway under the Act, the Rother Valley Railway (later the Kent and East Sussex Railway).

The railways were planned, and some later run, from an office at 23 Salford Terrace in Tonbridge, Kent, which Stephens had rented in 1900 and purchased in 1927.

Many of his railways stayed independent of the larger systems created in the Grouping under the Railways Act 1921.

Stephens had no close relatives and never married. He had few interests outside of railways other than voluntary military service and Liberal Party politics. In 1916, during World War I, Stephens attained the rank of Lieutenant-Colonel in the Territorial Army (TA) with which he had been associated since the 1890s. He continued to support the TA throughout most of the 1920s.

When he died in 1931 aged 62, the management of his railways was taken over by his former "outdoor assistant" and life partner, W. H. Austen, who ran them until they closed or were incorporated into the national system in 1948.

A museum devoted to his life and achievements is at Tenterden Station in Kent.

The railways 
There are several books about Col. Stephens's railways. The railways in which Stephens was involved were:

Other projects 
Stephens was involved in many projects that did not come to fruition, 18 of which reached the early, Light Railway Order, stage. Many were extensions to existing railways; one was the 1920s 'Southern Heights Light Railway', a single-track electrified railway from Orpington to Sanderstead.

He was involved in:
Central Essex Railway
East Kent Light Railway Extensions
East Sussex Railway
Gower Railway
Hadlow Railway
Headcorn and Faversham Junction Railway
Headcorn and Maidstone Junction Railway
Hedingham and Long Melford Railway
Kelvedon, Coggeshall and Halstead Railway
Lands End, St Just and Great Western Junction Railway
Long Melford and Hadleigh Railway
Maidstone and Faversham Junction Railway
Maidstone and Sittingbourne Railway
Newport and Four Ashes Railway
Orpington, Cudham and Tatsfield Railway
Shropshire Railways (Shrewsbury and Market Drayton Extension)
Southern Heights Light Railway
Surrey and Sussex Railway
Worcester and Broom Railway

Locomotives
The majority of the locomotives were second-hand, but a few were bought new from Hawthorn Leslie and Company including:

None of these has been preserved.

References

External links 
 Colonel Stephens Society
 Colonel Stephens Railway Museum

1868 births
1931 deaths
Alumni of University College London
British civil engineers
British railway entrepreneurs
Hawthorn Leslie and Company locomotives